Züm (pronounced Zoom, IPA: /zuːm/) is a bus rapid transit system for the suburban city of Brampton, Ontario, Canada, northwest of Toronto owned and operated by Brampton Transit. There are connections to the City of Mississauga, York Region, and the City of Toronto, with the first corridor having started service in fall 2010.

The first phase calls for three corridors operating in mixed traffic, similar to York Region Transit's (YRT) Viva network. Phase 1 became fully operational by fall 2012. A key aspect of the Züm plan is increased service on supporting local corridors. Unlike other, similar, services and partly due to Brampton's geographic position farther from Toronto than other suburbs such as Mississauga or Vaughan, many Züm corridors will overlap significantly with other agencies' services, requiring more complex, co-operative planning between neighbouring cities. During the planning of this bus rapid transit system, Züm was called Acceleride.

History

Phase 1 planned for three express corridors to improve service on some of Brampton's busiest routes.

Some stops and routes are located outside of Brampton, namely Mississauga, Toronto and Vaughan. Once the Queen route leaves Brampton and enters Vaughan, the bus schedule alternates between express (along Highway 407) with no stops until York University, or regular (along York Regional Road 7) with stops at all stations that are on the York Region Transit Viva Orange route. Brampton Transit has a fare partnership agreement with York Region Transit that allows for boarding and debarking anywhere along the Viva Orange route, using Züm buses.  This was particularly convenient during a labour dispute involving select contracted companies at York Region Transit resulting in the temporary suspension of Viva Orange.

In phase 2, the existing routes will be extended to the west. Beyond phase 2, the agency plans to look into exclusive busways.

Routes

Terminals
In preparation for the launch of Route 501 (Queen Street), Brampton Transit re-built its Bramalea City Centre terminal, relocating it from its previous location beside Clark Boulevard, on the south side of the shopping centre, to the north-east corner, adjacent to Queen Street. Minor renovations will also be performed at the downtown terminal.

In preparation for the launch of its Steeles Avenue route, Brampton Transit also relocated the Shoppers' World terminal, near Hurontario and Steeles, to be closer to Hurontario/Main Street.

Züm uses Brampton's downtown, Bramalea, and Brampton Gateway terminals, in addition to Mississauga's City Centre terminal, and Toronto's York University Commons terminal. In December 2017, Züm connected to the TTC subway system at Vaughan Metropolitan Centre.

Intermodal transfer points

These stops allow interchange to other services, including Brampton Transit, Mississauga Transit, GO Transit, and the Toronto Transit Commission.

Fares
Similar to York Region's Viva service, Züm buses shares the same fare structure as the conventional Brampton Transit system. Further partnership between the two agencies permits YRT customers to board Züm buses within York Region and pay standard YRT fares (despite the fact that Viva uses proof-of-payment and Züm does not).

The Presto card fare payment system has been active on Züm since 2011.

See also
 MoveOntario 2020
 Viva Rapid Transit (York Region Transit)
 MiExpress (MiWay)

References

External links

 
 Acceleride – Brampton Rapid Transit Initiative
 Transportation and Transit Master Plan
 Acceleride – Rapid Transit Corridor Opportunities
 Government of Canada $95 million investment, January 8, 2008

Brampton Transit
Proposed public transport in the Greater Toronto Area
Bus rapid transit in Canada
2010 establishments in Ontario